Ensen (Human) is a 2017 album by Emel Mathlouthi.

Track listing
 "Instant" – 4:04
 "Ensen Dhaif" – 4:22
 "Layem" – 4:25
 "Kaddesh" – 4:31
 "Lost" – 4:30
 "Thamlaton" – 5:22
 "Princess Melancholy" – 4:19
 "Sallem" – 3:58
 "Khayef" – 4:21
 "Shkun Ena" – 3:55
 "Fi Kolli Yawmen" (bonus track) – 8:54

Personnel

Musicians
Imed Alibi – percussion
Amine Metani – electronic percussion, piano, Tunisian gumbri
Minami Kato – strings/pads
Manu Trouvé – piano
Emel Mathlouthi – vocals, guitar, piano
Karim Attoumane – guitar
Eleanor Norton – cello
Hamilton Berry – cello
Simone Giuliani – strings arrangements

Technical
Amine Metani – producer, programming, mixing 
Emel Mathlouthi – producer, programming, vocal arrangements
Valgeir Sigurðsson – producer 
Johannes Berglund – producer, mixing
Heba Kadry – mastering
Alex and Iggy – photography
Donovan Brien – design

References

2017 albums
Albums produced by Valgeir Sigurðsson
Arabic-language albums
Emel Mathlouthi albums